Charles Henry Gordon-Lennox, 11th Duke of Richmond, 11th Duke of Lennox, 11th Duke of Aubigny, 6th Duke of Gordon DL (born 8 January 1955), styled Lord Settrington until 1989 and then Earl of March and Kinrara until 2017, is a British aristocrat and owner of Goodwood Estate in West Sussex. He is the founder of the Goodwood Festival of Speed and the Goodwood Revival.

He is president of the British Automobile Racing Club, Patron of the TT Riders Association, and an honorary member of the British Racing Drivers Club, the Guild of Motoring Writers, and the 500 Owners Club.

Photography
Having had a passion for film and photography since the age of 10, Lord Settrington left Eton College at the first possible opportunity and at 17 worked for the film director Stanley Kubrick on the film Barry Lyndon.

Goodwood

The Earl of March, as he was then known, moved from London to the family seat Goodwood to take over management of the estate, following the family tradition of the duke handing over management of the estate to the heir apparent when the latter turns forty.

Motorsport at Goodwood was started by his grandfather, Freddie Richmond, who opened the Goodwood Motor Circuit in 1948. March established the Festival of Speed at Goodwood House in 1993. He then brought motor racing back to the circuit, which had closed in 1966, with the creation of the Goodwood Revival in 1998. Both events have since become recognised  as some of the most unusual, exciting and creative events in the world.

The Goodwood Estate covers 12,000 acres to the north of Chichester. The Goodwood Estate Company is a diverse portfolio of businesses which includes: Goodwood Racecourse, a 4,000-acre organic farm, two eighteen-hole golf courses, Goodwood Aerodrome and Flying School, and a 91-bedroom hotel. The Group employs over 550 people and attracts 800,000 visitors to the Estate each year. The headquarters of Rolls-Royce Motor Cars is also on the Estate.

Marriages and children
Richmond has been married twice and has three sons and two daughters. He was married firstly in 1976 to Sally Clayton, daughter of Maurice Clayton. They had one daughter:

 Lady Alexandra Gordon-Lennox (born 1985)

Richmond and his first wife were divorced in 1989 and on 30 November 1991 he married secondly The Hon Janet Elizabeth Astor (born 1 December 1961), daughter of William Astor, 3rd Viscount Astor. They have one daughter and three sons:

 Charles Henry Gordon-Lennox, Earl of March and Kinrara (born 20 December 1994), heir apparent to the dukedoms.
 Lord William Rupert Charles Gordon-Lennox (born 29 November 1996)
 Lady Eloise Cordelia Gordon-Lennox (born 10 March 2000)
 Lord Frederick Lysander Gordon-Lennox (born 10 March 2000)

In January 2016, he and the Duchess (then Earl and Countess of March) were attacked and tied up in a major jewel robbery at Goodwood.

Titles
 8 January 1955 – 2 November 1989: Lord Settrington 
 2 November 1989 – 1 September 2017: Earl of March and Kinrara
 1 September 2017 – present: His Grace The Duke of Richmond, Lennox, and Gordon

In popular culture
March's name appears in the video game Gran Turismo 6, when he sends players an invitation related to the Goodwood Festival of Speed.

References

External links
 Information about his association with Goodwood

 2012 Goodwood Revival Picture Gallery

1955 births
Living people
British people of French descent
English people of Scottish descent
People educated at Eton College
Deputy Lieutenants of West Sussex
20th-century English farmers
20th-century English landowners
20th-century British businesspeople
21st-century British businesspeople
Photographers from London
English Anglicans
House of Stuart (Charles)
211
Dukes of Richmond
Dukes of Aubigny
11
21st-century British landowners